György Kékes (born 21 June 1966) is a Hungarian wrestler. He competed in the men's Greco-Roman 130 kg at the 1996 Summer Olympics.

References

1966 births
Living people
Hungarian male sport wrestlers
Olympic wrestlers of Hungary
Wrestlers at the 1996 Summer Olympics
Martial artists from Budapest